Claygate railway station serves the village of Claygate, in Surrey, England. It is on the New Guildford Line from London Waterloo to Guildford.

The station, and all trains serving it, are operated by South Western Railway. It is  down the line from Waterloo.

Services
All services at Claygate are operated by South Western Railway using  EMUs.

The typical off-peak service in trains per hour is:
 2 tph to  via 
 2 tph to 

On Sundays, the service is reduced to hourly in each direction.

Immediate surroundings
The station is beside the midpoint and village centre of Claygate.  It is the closest station to no other settlements.

References

External links

Railway stations in Surrey
Former London and South Western Railway stations
Railway stations in Great Britain opened in 1885
Railway stations served by South Western Railway
1885 establishments in England
Borough of Elmbridge